Admiral Edward Francis Bruen, CB (7 November 1866 – 22 November 1952) was a Royal Navy officer.

Admiral Bruen was the son of the Irish Conservative politician Henry Bruen. He entered HMS Britannia as a cadet in 1880.

Bruen commanded the battleship HMS Bellerophon from 1913 to 1916, in which he took part in the Battle of Jutland in 1916. Later that year, he took command of the new battleship HMS Resolution.

He was Director of Naval Equipment from 1920 to 1922.

References 

1866 births
1952 deaths
Companions of the Order of the Bath
Royal Navy admirals
Royal Navy admirals of World War I